Events from the year 1603 in Denmark.

Incumbents 
 Monarch – Christian IV

Events

Births 
 6 April – Simon Paulli, physician and naturalist (died 1680)
 10 April – Christian, Prince-Elect of Denmark (died 1647 in Dresden)
 8 December  Steen Beck, statesman and landholder (died 1648)

Deaths

References 

 
Denmark
Years of the 17th century in Denmark